The Hazardous Substances Data Bank (HSDB) is a toxicology database on the U.S. National Library of Medicine's (NLM) Toxicology Data Network (TOXNET). It focuses on the toxicology of potentially hazardous chemicals, and includes information on human exposure, industrial hygiene, emergency handling procedures, environmental fate, regulatory requirements, and related areas. All data are referenced and derived from a core set of books, government documents, technical reports, and selected primary journal literature. Prior to 2020, all entries were peer-reviewed by a Scientific Review Panel (SRP), members of which represented a spectrum of professions and interests. Last Chairs of the SRP are Dr. Marcel J. Cassavant, MD, Toxicology Group, and Dr. Roland Everett Langford, PhD, Environmental Fate Group.  The SRP was terminated due to budget cuts and realignment of the NLM.

The HSDB is organized into individual chemical records, and contains over 5000 such records. It is accessible free of charge via TOXNET. Users can search by chemical or other name, chemical name fragment, CAS registry number and/or subject terms.  Recent additions include radioactive materials and certain mixtures, like crude oil and oil dispersants as well as animal toxins. , there are approximately 5,600 chemical specific HSDB records available.

TOXNET databases
The Toxicology Data Network (TOXNET) is a group of databases hosted on the National Library of Medicine (NLM) website that covers "chemicals and drugs, diseases and the environment, environmental health, occupational safety and health, poisoning, risk assessment and regulations, and toxicology". TOXNET is managed by the NLM's Toxicology and Environmental Health Information Program (TEHIP) in the Division of Specialized Information Services (SIS).

The TOXNET databases include:

HSDB: Hazardous Substances Data Bank
Peer-reviewed toxicology data for over 5,000 hazardous chemicals 
TOXLINE
4 million references to literature on biochemical, pharmacological, physiological, and toxicological effects of drugs and other chemicals 
ChemIDplus
Dictionary of over 400,000 chemicals (names, synonyms, and structures)
LactMed: Drugs and Lactation Database
Drugs and other chemicals to which breastfeeding mothers may be exposed
DART: Developmental and Reproductive Toxicology Database
References to developmental and reproductive toxicology literature
TOXMAP
Environmental Health Maps provides searchable, interactive maps of EPA TRI and Superfund data, plus US Census and NCI health data 
TRI: Toxics Release Inventory
Annual environmental releases of over 600 toxic chemicals by U.S. facilities	
CTD: Comparative Toxicogenomics Database
Access to scientific data describing relationships between chemicals, genes and human diseases
Household Products Database
Potential health effects of chemicals in more than 10,000 common household products
Haz-Map
Links jobs and hazardous tasks with occupational diseases and their symptoms
IRIS: Integrated Risk Information System
Hazard identification and dose-response assessment for over 500 chemicals
ITER: International Toxicity Estimates for Risk
Risk information for over 600 chemicals from authoritative groups worldwide
ALTBIB
 Resources on Alternatives to the Use of Live Vertebrates in Biomedical Research and Testing

References

External links
TOXNET information

Chemical safety
Toxicology
Chemical databases
Biological databases
Breastfeeding